is a Japanese actress and voice actress from the Hodogaya-ku ward of Yokohama. Mitsuhashi is best known for her roles as Killua Zoldyck from Hunter × Hunter, Rico from Gunslinger Girl, and Suzuka Asahina from Suzuka. She was married to fellow voice actor Kōji Yusa. However, Yusa publicly announced their divorce in 2012 on his radio station.

Filmography
Leading roles indicated in bold.

Voice over roles

Animation
Absolute Boy - Miki Miyama
Ballad of a Shinigami - Tomato Fujiwara
Fuuka - Suzuka Asahina
Gunslinger Girl - Rico
Hunter × Hunter (1999) - Killua Zoldyck
Hyper Police - Samantha Grey
Kero Kero Chime - Suu
Kochikame - Naoko Seisho
Star Ocean EX - Leon
Sugar Sugar Rune - Jun Mitsumura
Suzuka - Suzuka Asahina
The Prince of Tennis - Kouhei Tanaka

Original video animation
Agent Aika - Black
Hunter × Hunter - Killua Zoldyck
Hunter × Hunter: Greed Island - Killua Zoldyck
Hunter × Hunter: Greed Island Final - Killua Zoldyck

References

External links
 

1978 births
Living people
Japanese video game actresses
Japanese voice actresses
Voice actresses from Yokohama